ʻAbd al-Nūr (ALA-LC romanization of ) is a male given name and, in modern usage, surname. The name is used by Muslims and also by Coptic and Orthodox Christians in the Middle East. It is built from the Arabic words ʻabd and al-Nūr, one of the names of God in the Qur'an, which give rise to the Muslim theophoric names. It means "servant of the Light".

Because the letter n is a sun letter, the letter l of the al- is assimilated to it. Thus although the name is written in Arabic with letters corresponding to Abd al-Nur, the usual pronunciation corresponds to Abd an-Noor. Alternative transliterations include Abdennour and others, all subject to variable spacing and hyphenation.

Notable people
Monir Fakhri Abdel Nour (born 1945), Egyptian politician
Jean Abdelnour (born 1983), Lebanese basketball player
Cyrine Abdelnour (born 1977), Lebanese singer, actress, and model
Ziad Abdelnour (born 1960), Lebanese-born
Aymen Abdennour (born 1989), Tunisian footballer
Mustafa Haji Abdinur (born 1981), Somali journalist
James Abdnor (1923–2012), American politician
Abdulahad AbdulNour (1888-1948), Iraqi physician, politician, and humanitarian
Thabit AbdulNour (1890–1957), Iraqi politician, government administrator, and diplomat
Abdennour Abrous (1934–2020), Algerian diplomat
Abdennour Cherif El Ouazzani (born 1986), Algerian footballer
Antone AbdulNour (1849-1914), Judge, merchant, and scholar in Mosul, Ottoman Empire
Abdulaziz AbdulNour (1850-1927) Judge, merchant, and philanthropist in Mosul, Ottoman Empire and Iraqi Kingdom

References

Arabic-language surnames
Arabic masculine given names